Since When is a 1998 album by Canadian rock band 54-40. It marks the band's return to the more acoustic folk rock sound of their 1980s albums. The album was the highest-charting album in the band's history, peaking at No. 19 on the RPM Canadian Albums Chart.  Also, the album's lead single and title track, "Since When", is the highest-charting single in the band's history. The album features the song "Stormy", which had been written in the early 1990s.

Track listing
 "In Your Image"  – 3:52
 "Lost and Lazy"  – 3:17
 "Since When"  – 4:14
 "I Could Give You More"  – 3:31
 "You Should Come Over"  – 3:37
 "Runaway John"  – 2:18
 "Pay for Living"  – 3:17
 "Angel in My Bed"  – 3:24
 "Playground"  – 2:23
 "Greatest Mistake"  – 3:26
 "Stormy"  – 5:31
 "Last People on Earth"  – 2:10
 "Extra Special Mystery Bonus Track"  – 1:25

References

1998 albums
54-40 albums